Maraš is a Serbo-Croatian surname. Notable people with the surname include:

Ivan Maraš (born 1986), Montenegrin professional basketballer
Maja Maraš (born 1991), Montenegrin beauty queen
Marjana Maraš (born 1970), Serbian politician
Nikola Maraš (born 1995), Serbian professional footballer

Montenegrin surnames
Serbian surnames
Slavic-language surnames
Patronymic surnames